Keith Benjamin Bakker (born November 24, 1960) is an American-Dutch former mental health practitioner and convicted criminal. A long-time drug addict himself, he specialized in drug rehabilitation and became known in the Netherlands for his addiction clinic, Smith & Jones, and appearances on several Dutch television programs.

Bakker was sentenced to prison for the sexual abuse of female ex-clients and had been detained from April 2011 to September 2014.

Bakker was convicted and sentenced on March 3, 2021, on the charge of rape of a minor and sentenced to 4.5 years imprisonment.

Personal life
Bakker grew up in Westport, Connecticut and started using alcohol and drugs as a teenager. He used heroin for the first time on his eighteenth birthday. In the 1980's, Bakker worked as a roadie, traveling with Michael Jackson, Prince, and Bruce Springsteen, among others.

Bakker came to Amsterdam in 1985. In the following years, he was addicted to drugs. He contracted HIV from an infected syringe. In 1989, he came into contact with a social worker at Youth With A Mission, who helped him become clean.  Subsequently, Bakker married and became a music industry manager.

In 1996, Bakker relapsed into hard drug addiction. After a trial during which he threatened a police officer, he was sent to the Jellinek Clinic in Amsterdam. In July 1998, he had a heart attack, the result of an overdose of drugs under a bridge. A month later, Bakker was clean again after a stay in a hospital and following the Minnesota Model therapy program in Scotland.

The Clinic
In 2004, Bakker opened the Smith & Jones clinic for drug and alcohol addicts. In 2006 it became the first clinic in Europe to focus on people with a video game addiction. The clinic had locations in Amsterdam and Wassenaar.

In the same period, Bakker also appeared regularly on Dutch television talk shows and reality series. He was a frequent guest in Spuiten en Slikken as an addiction expert and coached troubled teenagers (and their families) in Van etter tot engel and Family Matters. 2008 also saw the release of Bakker's biography entitled Pushing the Limits, written by Dutch author Leon Verdonschot.

By the end of 2009, during an interview with NCRV, Bakker stated that it was thanks to his clinic that he had managed to introduce the Twelve-Step Program in the Netherlands, which he had followed himself in Scotland. (The Twelve Step Program existed in The Netherlands well before his clinic began).

Having become involved in a renting conflict, Bakker resigned as manager of Smith & Jones in September 2010. The clinic itself closed shortly afterwards.

Indictment and conviction
By the end of 2010, Bakker was accused of sexual abuse by several of his female clients. After an investigation by the Amsterdam vice squad, Bakker was arrested in April 2011 and was held on remand. During the trial in March 2012, Bakker admitted that he performed sexual abuse with some of his clients, but denied that he had sexual intercourse with them. In April 2012 eventually, the court convicted Bakker of sexual abuse and sentenced him to five years imprisonment and a ten-year prohibition from executing his profession as a mental health practitioner. His clinic, Smith & Jones, had already been declared bankrupt in March 2011.

Bakker was released from prison in September 2014.

Bakker was arrested on new charges of rape and violating his professional ban in 2019. He was subsequently convicted on the charge of rape and sentenced to 4.5 years imprisonment on March 3, 2021. After a successful appeal, his sentence was reduced to 18 months imprisonment. Subsequently, Bakker was released from prison on July 13, 2022.

Goliath Project 
In 2018, Keith Bakker founded and launched the Goliath project 2018. The original "Goliath project" was launched in 2000 by Keith Bakker as well. The focus of the original Goliath project was cross-border healthcare inside the EU based on Article 86 of the European treaty. As a result of his efforts, two major UK clinics, Castle Craig and the Priory group were able to treat Dutch patients in the United Kingdom.

The Goliath project 2018 is an advocate/activist organization that is focused on medically managed addiction treatment for prisoners in the European Union. The basis for their efforts is article 3 of the EU human rights charter.

References

21st-century Dutch criminals
1960 births
Living people
American emigrants to the Netherlands
American people imprisoned abroad
American people of Dutch descent
Dutch people of American descent
Dutch prisoners and detainees
Dutch television personalities
Mental health professionals
Criminals from Amsterdam
People from Westport, Connecticut
People with HIV/AIDS
Prisoners and detainees of the Netherlands
Criminals from New York City